Euspira subplicata is a species of predatory sea snail, a marine gastropod mollusk in the family Naticidae, the moon snails.

Description
The length of the shell attains 10 mm.

Distribution
This species occurs in the Atlantic Ocean off Morocco.

References

 Gofas, S.; Luque, Á. A.; Templado, J.; Salas, C. (2017). A national checklist of marine Mollusca in Spanish waters. Scientia Marina. 81(2) : 241-254, and supplementary online material

External links
 Jeffreys, J. G. (1878-1885). On the Mollusca procured during the H. M. S. "Lightning" and "Porcupine" expedition. Proceedings of the Zoological Society of London. Part 1 (1878): 393-416, pls 22-23; Part 2 (1879): 553-588 pl. 45-46 [October 1879; Part 3 (1881): 693-724, pl. 61; Part 4 (1881): 922-952, pls 70-71 [1882]; Part 5 (1882): 656-687, pls 49-50 [1883]. Part 6 (1883): 88-115 pls 19-20; Part 7 (1884): 111-149, pls 9-10; Part 8 (1884): 341-372, pls 26-28; Part 9 (1885): 27-63 pls 4-6]
 Locard A. (1897-1898). Expéditions scientifiques du Travailleur et du Talisman pendant les années 1880, 1881, 1882 et 1883. Mollusques testacés. Paris, Masson. vol. 1 [1897, p. 1-516 pl. 1-22; vol. 2 [1898], p. 1-515, pl. 1-18]
 Gofas, S.; Luque, Á. A.; Templado, J.; Salas, C. (2017). A national checklist of marine Mollusca in Spanish waters. Scientia Marina. 81(2) : 241-254, and supplementary online material
  Serge GOFAS, Ángel A. LUQUE, Joan Daniel OLIVER,José TEMPLADO & Alberto SERRA (2021) - The Mollusca of Galicia Bank (NE Atlantic Ocean); European Journal of Taxonomy 785: 1–114

Naticidae
Gastropods described in 1885